Solihten Institute (formerly known as The Samaritan Institute) is a non-profit organization based in Denver, Colorado which manages an international network of faith-based counseling centers (Member Centers) that specialize in evidence-based, integrated healing. Counselors and mental health professionals accredited by Solihten Institute receive theological training in addition to typical licensing in psychology, psychiatry and counseling, enabling an approach which combines "mind, body, spirit, and community." Services offered include outpatient counseling, wellness programs, and consultation and training for clergy and other professionals. This is a 12-step organization.

History
Founded in Elkhart, Indiana in 1972 by a physician, two parish ministers and a seminary professor as The Samaritan Institute, the philosophy sought to emphasize the unity of mind, body, spirit, and community in counseling through the collaboration of clergy, therapists and physicians. The program first formed as a part of First Presbyterian Church of Elkhart as part of the church's counseling center. Following the expansion of the Samaritan Institute name and model to other churches, in 1979, the Samaritan Institute was formed as a non-profit corporation seeking to unite and develop existing and future counseling centers. In anticipation of continued growth, in 1983, the Institute relocated its headquarters to Denver, Colorado, where it could better manage its nationwide network.

Today, Solihten Institute and its Member Centers are one of the largest national providers of faith-based counseling. Nearly fifty Solihten Member Centers exist in over 200 locations throughout the United States. Solihten Member Centers, which are the independently run affiliates of Solihten Institute, use facilities provided by sponsor churches — about 4,000 congregations of 26 denominations support the Solihten program. The model is cost-effective in practice and is capable of offering counseling at lower rates than many other programs. Annually, Solihten Member Centers donate more than $20,000,000 in subsidized counseling to individuals in need of assistance.

Solihten Institute is a 501(c)(3) organization, governed by a board of directors in consultation with a national council of Center executive directors. Bob Johnson currently serves as president.

The Solihten Institute Counseling Model
As a spiritually integrated (or faith-based) therapy program, counselors and professionals in the Solihten program represent various disciplines, including psychology, clinical social work, marriage and family therapy, pastoral counseling and psychiatry. In addition, counselors are trained in theology and are better able to address the religious perspectives of clients, incorporating them into the therapeutic process. Declaration of any particular religious belief is not a requirement for treatment, however, and counselors do not impose personal theological beliefs upon those being treated, but instead work within a spiritual context when appropriate. In addition, local physicians and ministers work in collaboration with therapists to best serve a client's varying needs. The Solihten program has been acknowledged by the American Medical Association, the American Association of Pastoral Counselors, the President's Commission on Mental Health, and a number of major religious denominations.

Ethics in Business Awards
Solihten Institute sponsored the Ethics in Business Awards program, which is conducted by Solihten Member Centers worldwide. The Awards are to honor community leaders, businesses, and non-profit organizations which promote social responsibility, civic improvement, environmental concerns or ethical conduct.

External links
Official website

Organizations established in 1972
Social welfare parachurch organizations
Mental health organizations in Colorado
1972 establishments in Indiana